The Operational Art of War II: Modern Battles 1956–2000 is a 1999 computer wargame developed and published by TalonSoft. It is the second game in the Operational Art of War series.

Development
The Operation Art of War II was developed by TalonSoft as a sequel to its earlier game The Operational Art of War Vol. 1: 1939–1955.

Reception
{{Video game reviews
| rev1 = CNET Gamecenter
| rev1Score = 9/10<ref name=gamecenter>{{cite web | archiveurl=https://web.archive.org/web/20000816172017/http://gamecenter.com/Reviews/Item/0,6,0-2825,00.html | url=http://gamecenter.com/Reviews/Item/0,6,0-2825,00.html | title=PC Reviews; The Operational Art of War, Volume II | author=Dultz, Marc | date=May 25, 1999 | work=CNET Gamecenter | archivedate=August 16, 2000 | url-status=dead }}</ref>
}}

In the United States, The Operational Art of War Volume II sold 1,298 copies during 1999.The Operational Art of War II won the 1999 Charles Roberts Award for "Best 20th Century Era Computer Wargame". The editors of PC Gamer US nominated The Operational Art of War Volume II for their 1999 "Best Wargame" award, although it lost to Close Combat III: The Russian Front. They wrote that "no serious wargaming library should be without a copy" of Volume II. Computer Gaming World also nominated The Operational Art of War Volume II as 1999's "Wargame of the Year", a prize ultimately given to Sid Meier's Antietam! The editors noted it as a step down from the first game. CNET Gamecenter nominated Modern Battles for its "Best Turn-Based Strategy Game" award, which went to Sid Meier's Alpha Centauri''.

References

External links
The Operational Art of War II: Modern Battles 1956-2000

1999 video games
Computer wargames
TalonSoft games
Windows games
Windows-only games
Video games developed in the United States